John Richard Hauser is the Kirin Professor of Marketing and Head of the Marketing Group at the MIT Sloan School of Management. He is one of the founders of the field of Marketing Science and was Editor-in-Chief of the academic journal Marketing Science from 1989 to 1995.

He holds S.B., S.M., and Sc.D. degrees in EECS from MIT, earned in 1973, 1973, and 1975 respectively.  He also earned an S.M. in Civil & Environmental Engineering from MIT, also in 1973. 

He was elected to the 2006 class of Fellows of the Institute for Operations Research and the Management Sciences.

References

External links
 Official Site

Living people
MIT Sloan School of Management faculty
Year of birth missing (living people)
Fellows of the Institute for Operations Research and the Management Sciences